Papilio peranthus is a butterfly of the family Papilionidae. It is found in Indonesia (including Java, Sulawesi and the Lesser Sunda Islands).

The wingspan is 70–90 mm.

Subspecies
Papilio peranthus peranthus (Java)
Papilio peranthus adamantius C. & R. Felder, 1865 (Celebes)
Papilio peranthus intermedius Snellen, 1890 (Tanadjampea, Bonerate, Kalaotoa)
Papilio peranthus fulgens Röber, 1891 (Bonerate, Lombok, Sambawa, Flores, Pura, Adonara)
Papilio peranthus baweanus Hagen, 1896 (Bawean)
Papilio peranthus transiens Fruhstorfer, 1897 (Lesser Sunda Islands)
Papilio peranthus insulicola Rothschild, 1896 (Saleyer)

Gallery

Other reading
Erich Bauer and Thomas Frankenbach, 1998 Schmetterlinge der Erde, Butterflies of the world Part I (1), Papilionidae Papilionidae I: Papilio, Subgenus Achillides, Bhutanitis, Teinopalpus. Edited by  Erich Bauer and Thomas Frankenbach.  Keltern : Goecke & Evers ; Canterbury : Hillside Books

External links

Butterfly Corner
Butterfly Taxidermy

peranthus
Butterflies of Borneo
Butterflies of Java
Butterflies described in 1787